Bremerhaven-Speckenbüttel is a currently closed railway station on the line from Cuxhaven to Bremerhaven. 
The station (which shares its common name with the nearby Bremerhaven Seehafen freight yard) was closed in the early 1980s, along with several others on the line. The station might be reopened when the Bremen S-Bahn scheme becomes effective in 2010.

Railway stations in Bremen (state)
Speckenbuttel